Anna Emilie Møller (born 28 July 1997) is a Danish athlete competing in the 3000 metres steeplechase. She represented  her country at the 2016 Summer Olympics without qualifying for the final. In her heat, however, she set the new national and European junior record in the event.

In 2016, she finished in 5th place in the final of the women's 3000 metres steeplechase event at the 2016 IAAF World U20 Championships held in Bydgoszcz, Poland.

In 2019, she competed in the senior women's race at the 2019 IAAF World Cross Country Championships held in Aarhus, Denmark. She finished in 15th place.

International competitions

Personal bests
Outdoor
800 metres – 2:05.91 (Aarhus 2016)
1500 metres – 4:09.12 (Watford 2019)
3000 metres – 8:47.83 (Zagreb 2016)
5000 metres – 15:07.70 (Gävle 2019)
10,000 metres – 34:29.41 (Aarhus 2015)
3000 metres steeplechase – 9:13.46 (Doha 2019)

References

Living people
1997 births
Danish female steeplechase runners
Athletes (track and field) at the 2016 Summer Olympics
Olympic athletes of Denmark
Athletes from Copenhagen
Athletes (track and field) at the 2020 Summer Olympics
20th-century Danish women
21st-century Danish women
Danish female middle-distance runners